Hamworthy United Football Club is a football club based in Hamworthy, a suburb of Poole, England. The club are affiliated to the Dorset FA.

History

Pre-merger
Hamworthy Football Club was established in 1926, and were founder members of the Dorset Combination in 1957. Trinidad Old Boys joined the Dorset Combination in 1965.

Post-merger
The two clubs merged in 1970 to form Hamworthy United, continuing in the Dorset Combination and playing at Hamworthy's County Ground. They were Dorset Combination champions in 1976–77 and won the League Cup in 1989–90. In 2002 the league was renamed the Dorset Premier League, with Hamworthy going on to win the league in its first season under the new name. They retained the title the following season, also winning the league's Charity Shield, and were promoted to Division One of the Wessex League.

In their first season in the Wessex League, Hamworthy won the League Cup, defeating Thatcham Town in the final. They went on to win the Dorset Senior Cup the following season with a 2–1 win over Poole Town in the final. In 2006 Division One of the Wessex League was renamed the Premier Division. They reached the final of the League Cup in 2008–09 and the Dorset Senior Cup in 2013–14, but lost in both matches.

Hamworthy won the Wessex League Cup in 2020–21, beating United Services Portsmouth 3–1 in the final. The 2021–22 season saw the club win the Premier Division, earning promotion to Division One South of the Southern League. At the start of the 2022–23 they also won the inaugural Wessex League Charity Shield, defeating Shaftesbury 2–0.

Ground 
Hamworthy moved to the County Ground in 1950, with the ground becoming home to the new club after the 1970 merger.

Honours
Wessex League
Premier Division champions 2021–22
League Cup winners 2004–05, 2020–21
Charity Shield winners 2022–23
Dorset Premier League
Champions 1976–77, 2002–03, 2003–04
League Cup winners 1989–90
Charity Shield winners 2003–04
Dorset Senior Cup
Winners 2005–06

Records
Best FA Cup performance: Second qualifying round 2007–08, 2008–09, 2013–14, 2021–22 
Best FA Vase performance: Semi-finals, 2021–22

See also
Hamworthy United F.C. players
Hamworthy United F.C. managers

References

External links
Official website

 
Football clubs in England
Football clubs in Dorset
Association football clubs established in 1970
1970 establishments in England
Sport in Poole
Dorset Premier Football League
Wessex Football League